The 2014 Four National Figure Skating Championships included the Czech Republic, Slovakia, Poland, and Hungary. The event was hosted by the Slovak association in Bratislava from 20 to 22 December 2013. Medals were awarded in the disciplines of men's singles, ladies' singles, pair skating, and ice dancing on the senior level. Some junior and novice-level events were also held.

The results were split by country; the three highest-placing skaters from each country in each discipline formed their national podiums. The results were among the criteria used to determine international assignments. It was the sixth consecutive season that the Czech Republic, Slovakia, and Poland held their national championships together and the first season that Hungary participated.

Medals summary

Czech Republic

Slovakia

Poland

Hungary

Junior medalists

Czech Republic

Poland

Hungary

Senior results

Men

Ladies

Pairs

Ice dancing

References

External links
 2014 Four National Championships results
 Slovak Figure Skating Association
 Czech Figure Skating Association
 Polish Figure Skating Association
 Hungarian Skating Association

Four Nationals Figure Skating Championships, 2014
Czech Figure Skating Championships
Slovak Figure Skating Championships
Polish Figure Skating Championships
Hungarian Figure Skating Championships
Four Nationals Figure Skating Championships
Four Nationals Figure Skating Championships
Four Nationals Figure Skating Championships
Four Nationals Figure Skating Championships